Orestes Kindelán Olivares (born November 1, 1964) is the most prolific home run hitter in the history of post-revolutionary Cuban baseball, known as "El Cañon de Dos Rios" and one of the offensive stars of the Cuba national baseball team, which won numerous World Cups and two Olympic gold medals during his tenure. He is a cousin of amateur boxer Mario Kindelán.

Career
Kindelán played the bulk of his 21 seasons for his home province's Santiago de Cuba Avispas (Wasps). He holds Cuban National Series records for home runs (487, with aluminium bat 17 series), runs batted in (1,511), and total bases (3,893).

Kindelán played for Japanese corporate team Shidax between 2002 and 2004 in the Intercity baseball tournament.

Kindelán hit the longest home run ever at Atlanta–Fulton County Stadium, a third-deck home run during the 1996 Olympics.

Related players
 Omar Linares
 Antonio Pacheco Massó

References

External links

External links

 

1964 births
Living people
People from Palma Soriano
Olympic baseball players of Cuba
Olympic gold medalists for Cuba
Olympic silver medalists for Cuba
Olympic medalists in baseball
Medalists at the 1992 Summer Olympics
Medalists at the 2000 Summer Olympics
Medalists at the 1996 Summer Olympics
Baseball players at the 1992 Summer Olympics
Baseball players at the 1996 Summer Olympics
Baseball players at the 2000 Summer Olympics
Pan American Games gold medalists for Cuba
Baseball players at the 1991 Pan American Games
Baseball players at the 1995 Pan American Games
Baseball players at the 1999 Pan American Games
Cuban expatriate baseball players in Japan
Pan American Games medalists in baseball
Avispas de Santiago de Cuba players
Goodwill Games medalists in baseball
Competitors at the 1990 Goodwill Games
Medalists at the 1991 Pan American Games
Medalists at the 1995 Pan American Games
Medalists at the 1999 Pan American Games
20th-century Cuban people